Brian Sampson (born 30 July 1945) is a New Zealand cricketer. He played in two first-class matches for Canterbury in 1969/70.

See also
 List of Canterbury representative cricketers

References

External links
 

1945 births
Living people
New Zealand cricketers
Canterbury cricketers
Sportspeople from Ashburton, New Zealand